Maxwell Santos Silva (born 23 April 1979), known as just Maxwell, is a Brazilian former football player, He played as a forward.

He joined South China on 5 September 2007.

On 28 December 2008, SCAA's Steven Lo said on his blog that Maxwell will be leaving SCAA during the January 2009 transfer window for either Australia's A League or Dubai, where he will receive double his current SCAA salary. He finally moved back to his former club Arabi Club in Dubai.

Career statistics in Hong Kong

References

External links
 Player Information on Scaafc.com

1979 births
Living people
Brazilian footballers
Brazilian expatriate footballers
Expatriate footballers in Bahrain
Association football forwards
Brazilian expatriate sportspeople in Hong Kong
Hong Kong First Division League players
Expatriate footballers in Iran
Esteghlal F.C. players
Expatriate footballers in Hong Kong
South China AA players
Expatriate footballers in Syria
Association football defenders
Hong Kong League XI representative players
Syrian Premier League players